Jennifer Marie Philpott Wilson (born 1975) is a United States district judge of the United States District Court for the Middle District of Pennsylvania.

Education 

Wilson earned her Bachelor of Arts, cum laude, from Swarthmore College and her Juris Doctor, summa cum laude, from Brooklyn Law School, where she served as the Executive Notes and Comments Editor for the Brooklyn Law Review.

Career 

Upon graduation from law school, Wilson served as a law clerk to Judge Jon Phipps McCalla of the United States District Court for the Western District of Tennessee and to Judge Julio M. Fuentes of the United States Court of Appeals for the Third Circuit.

She then served as a trial attorney with the Department of Justice's Tax Division and was an associate with Chadbourne & Parke LLP. From 2009 until 2019, she was a partner with Philpott Wilson LLP, in Duncannon, Pennsylvania, where her practice included civil litigation, criminal defense, and family law matters. From 2011 to 2012, she was an adjunct professor at Penn State Dickinson Law, teaching a course on written advocacy and judicial opinions.

Federal judicial service 

On May 3, 2019, President Donald Trump announced his intent to nominate Wilson to serve as a United States district judge for the United States District Court for the Middle District of Pennsylvania. On May 13, 2019, her nomination was sent to the Senate. President Trump nominated Wilson to the seat vacated by Judge Yvette Kane, who assumed senior status on October 11, 2018. On June 5, 2019 a hearing on her nomination was held before the Senate Judiciary Committee. On June 27, 2019, her nomination was reported out of committee by a 18–4 vote. On November 6, 2019, the United States Senate voted 89–3 to invoke cloture on her nomination. On November 7, 2019, her nomination was confirmed by a 88–3 vote. She received her judicial commission on November 8, 2019.

References

External links 
 

1975 births
Living people
20th-century American women lawyers
20th-century American lawyers
21st-century American women lawyers
21st-century American lawyers
21st-century American judges
21st-century American women judges
Brooklyn Law School alumni
Dickinson School of Law faculty
Judges of the United States District Court for the Middle District of Pennsylvania
Pennsylvania lawyers
Pennsylvania Republicans
People from Washington, D.C.
Swarthmore College alumni
United States Department of Justice lawyers
United States district court judges appointed by Donald Trump